Baishi Township is an rural township in Sangzhi County, Zhangjiajie, Hunan Province, China.

Administrative division
The township is divided into 12 villages, the following areas: Lianhua Village, Liping Village, Qiaogou Village, Shuangshi Village, Yanmen Village, Baishi Village, Gu Village, Liaocheng Village, Xinhua Village, Changyi Village, Longquan Village, and Yanlu Village (莲花村、李坪村、桥沟村、双狮村、岩门村、白石村、谷村、廖城村、新华村、长益村、龙泉村、岩路村).

References

External links

Former towns and townships of Sangzhi County